Alessandra Moretti (born 24 June 1973 in Vicenza) is an Italian politician who has been serving as a Member of the European Parliament since 2019.

Early life and education
Moretti graduated in law at the University of Urbino and has worked as a divorce lawyer since 2001.

Political career
Since her young age, Moretti was interested in politics, following her father, who had been active in the Italian Communist Party. She first entered politics with the Democrats of the Left. After some failed electoral campaigns (notably including that of the 2007 provincial election of Vicenza, on a list in support of Giorgio Carollo of Veneto for the EPP), in 2008 Moretti, who joined the Democratic Party (PD), was elected to the municipal council of Vicenza and was appointed Deputy Mayor with delegation for education and youth.

In 2012 Moretti gained national prominence when she was appointed by Pier Luigi Bersani spokeswoman of his campaign for the centre-left primary election. In the event, Bersani won the nomination for Prime Minister, but lost the 2013 general election. Moretti was however elected to the Chamber of Deputies for the PD.

In the 2014 European Parliament election Moretti was elected to the European Parliament but resigned in February 2015 to contest local elections and was replaced by Damiano Zoffoli.

In the 2015 Venetian regional election Moretti ran for President of Veneto, but gained a mere 22.7% of the vote and was thus defeated by incumbent President Luca Zaia of Northern League, who secured 50.1% of the vote.

In the 2019 European elections, Moretti re-entered the European Parliament. She has since been serving on the Committee on the Environment, Public Health and Food Safety. She later also joined the Special Committee on Beating Cancer (2020) and the Special Committee on the COVID-19 pandemic (2022).  In addition to her committee assignments, she is part of the Parliament's delegation for relations with Japan. She is also a member of the Spinelli Group and the European Parliament Intergroup on Children’s Rights.

References

External links 

European Parliament - Alessandra Moretti

1973 births
Living people
People from Vicenza
Democrats of the Left politicians
Deputies of Legislature XVII of Italy
Democratic Party (Italy) MEPs
Democratic Party (Italy) politicians
MEPs for Italy 2014–2019
MEPs for Italy 2019–2024
21st-century women MEPs for Italy
Politicians of Veneto
University of Urbino alumni
Women members of the Chamber of Deputies (Italy)